Cowcowing is a small town located just off the Koorda–Wyalkatchem road  from Perth,  south of Koorda and  north of Wyalkatchem in the Wheatbelt region of Western Australia.

The town originated as a railway siding and was later gazetted as a townsite in 1919. The name of the town is Aboriginal in origin and was first recorded by explorers in 1854. The name of the nearby lake recorded as "Gow gow eeh lake" has now been changed to Cowcowing Lake; the meaning of the name remains unknown.

The town is a Cooperative Bulk Handling receival site.

On 2 October 2022, a helicopter accident occurred near Cowcowing Lake, killing two people.

Notable residents

Captain Hugo Throssell (1884–1933), awarded Victoria Cross at Gallipoli

References 

Wheatbelt (Western Australia)
Grain receival points of Western Australia